Allcard v Skinner (1887) 36 Ch D 145 is a judicial decision under English law dealing with undue influence.

Facts
Miss Allcard was introduced by the Revd Mr Nihill to Miss Skinner, a lady superior of a Protestant religious order named "Sisters of the Poor". She had to observe vows of poverty and obedience. Three days after becoming a member, Miss Allcard made a will bequeathing all property to Miss Skinner, and passed on railway stock that she came into possession of in 1872 and 1874. She then claimed the money back after she left the sisterhood.

Judgment
Lindley LJ, held that she was unduly influenced but barred by laches from getting restitution. And in any case she would only have been able to recover as much of the gift as remained in the defendant’s hands after some of it had been spent in accordance with her wishes.

Cotton LJ said,

See also

Restitution in English law

Notes

References
A Burrows, J Edelman and E McKendrick, Cases and Materials on the Law of Restitution (2nd Ed, OUP, Oxford, 2007)

English unjust enrichment case law
English unconscionability case law
Lord Lindley cases
Court of Appeal (England and Wales) cases
1887 in case law
1887 in British law